Thomas Ford (died 28 May 1582), a Devonshire native, was a Catholic martyr executed during the reign of Elizabeth I.

Life
He received a Masters of Arts at Trinity College, Oxford, on 24 July 1567, and became a fellow (although one source says president) there. In 1570, he left for the English College, Douai, and was one of its first three students to be ordained, receiving his orders March 1573 in Brussels.

Soon after receiving his Bachelor of Divinity in Douai, on 2 May 1576, he left for England. There he settled in Berkshire, becoming the chaplain of James Braybrooke at Sutton Courtenay, and then of Francis Yate and the Bridgettine nuns who were staying with Yate at Lyford Grange. On 17 July 1581, he was arrested by the government spy, George Eliot, along with Edmund Campion. On 22 July of that same year, he was put in the Tower, where he was tortured.

Ford was taken to court along with John Shert on 16 November with a faked charge of conspiracy. It is said he had conspired in places he had never been (Rome and Rheims), on days he had been in England.  Both he and Short were condemned on 21 November and, along with Robert Johnson, beheaded in May 1582. All three were beatified in 1886.

Notes

References
 

English College, Douai alumni
Alumni of Trinity College, Oxford
Year of birth missing
1582 deaths
People from Vale of White Horse (district)
People from Sutton Courtenay
English beatified people
16th-century English Roman Catholic priests
People executed under Elizabeth I
Executed people from Devon
16th-century Roman Catholic martyrs
16th-century venerated Christians
People executed by Tudor England by decapitation
Forty-one Martyrs of England and Wales